The Brady Anderson and Waldemar Ager House is a historic house located at 514 West Madison Street in Eau Claire, Wisconsin. It was added to the National Register of Historic Places in 2000. Additionally, it has been designated a Literary Landmark by the National Association of Friends of Public Libraries.

History
The house was built from 1892 to 1894 by craftsman Brady Anderson. It was purchased by Norwegian newspaperman and author Waldemar Ager in 1903. The Ager family owned the house until 1962, when it was bought by the local hospital. In 1993, when the hospital need the land to expand its complex, the house was donated to the Waldemar Ager Foundation. Originally located on Chestnut Street, the house was then moved to its current location. Afterwards, the house was restored to its appearance during the 1900s. The second floor has since been converted into a resource library.

References

Houses in Eau Claire, Wisconsin
Houses on the National Register of Historic Places in Wisconsin
Libraries in Wisconsin
National Register of Historic Places in Eau Claire County, Wisconsin
Houses completed in 1894
Queen Anne architecture in Wisconsin